Troed-y-rhiw railway station is a railway station serving the village of Troed-y-rhiw in Merthyr Tydfil, Wales. It is located on the Merthyr branch of the Merthyr Line. Passenger services are provided by Transport for Wales.

History
The station was first opened by the Taff Vale Railway in late 1841 though it did not appear in Bradshaw's timetables until 1844. It was named Troedyrhiew from 1846/47 until 1 July 1924 when it became Troedyrhiw. The hyphens were added on 12 May 1980.

Services
On Sunday, there is a two-hourly service each way to Merthyr and Bridgend.

References

External links 

Railway stations in Merthyr Tydfil County Borough
DfT Category F2 stations
Former Taff Vale Railway stations
Railway stations in Great Britain opened in 1841
Railway stations served by Transport for Wales Rail